In Tune is a 1971 studio album by The Oscar Peterson Trio and The Singers Unlimited.

Track listing
 "Sesame Street" (Bruce Hart, Joe Raposo, Jon Stone) – 2:55
 "It Never Entered My Mind" (Lorenz Hart, Richard Rodgers) – 4:03
 "Children's Game" (Billy Blanco, Antonio Carlos Jobim) – 2:43
 "The Gentle Rain" (Luiz Bonfá, Matt Dubey) – 3:24
 "A Child Is Born" (Thad Jones) – 3:44
 "The Shadow of Your Smile" (Johnny Mandel, Paul Francis Webster) – 4:32
 "Catherine" (Patrick Williams) – 3:03
 "Once Upon a Summertime" (Eddie Barclay, Michel Legrand, Eddy Marnay, Johnny Mercer) – 3:29
 "Here's That Rainy Day" (Johnny Burke, Jimmy Van Heusen) – 4:40

Personnel

Performance
 Oscar Peterson – piano
 Jiří Mráz – double bass
 Louis Hayes - drums
 The Singers Unlimited - Vocals
 Gene Puerling
 Len Dresslar 
 Bonnie Herman 
 Don Shelton

References

1971 albums
Oscar Peterson albums
The Singers Unlimited albums
MPS Records albums